Susie Wild (born 28 June 1979) is an English poet, short story writer, journalist and editor based in Wales. She is currently publishing editor specialising in fiction and poetry at Parthian Books.

Biography
Susie Wild is author of the poetry collection Better Houses, the short story collection The Art of Contraception listed for the Edge Hill Prize, and the novella Arrivals. Her work has recently featured in Carol Ann Duffy’s pandemic project Write Where We Are Now, The Atlanta Review, Ink, Sweat & Tears and Poetry Wales. She placed second in the Welshpool Poetry Festival Competition 2020, was highly commended in the Prole Laureate Prize 2020, was shortlisted for an Ink Sweat & Tears Pick of the Month 2020 and longlisted in the Mslexia Women’s Poetry Competition 2018. Born in London, she lives in Cardiff.

Wild (also Wildsmith) is Parthian's publishing editor specialising in poetry and fiction. With Parthian since 2007, she’s worked with award-winning writers including Mari Elis Dunning, Lloyd Markham and Rebecca F. John. Following an MA in creative writing from Swansea University and an MA in Journalism from Goldsmiths, Wild has also built a portfolio career in the arts as a journalist, festival and events organiser, performer, editor and university lecturer.

Publications

Fiction
 The Art of Contraception (2010)
 Arrivals (2011)

Poetry
 Better Houses (2017)
 Windfalls (2021)

References

1979 births
Living people
English journalists
British women journalists
English columnists
English poets
21st-century English novelists
English short story writers
People from Tooting
21st-century English women writers
21st-century British short story writers
British women columnists
Writers from London